Shahsuvar may refer to:

Shahsavari, East Azerbaijan

See also
Shahsavar (disambiguation)
Şehsuvar (disambiguation)